Miss Chinese International Pageant 1994 was held on January 23, 1994, in Hong Kong. The pageant was organized and broadcast by TVB in Hong Kong. Miss Chinese International 1993 Christy Chung crowned Saesim Pornapa Sui of Bangkok, Thailand as the winner.

Pageant information
The theme to this year's pageant continues to be "The Traditions of the Dragon, The Embodiment of Beauty" 「龍的傳統  俏的化身」.  The Masters of Ceremonies were Eric Tsang and Philip Chan.

Results

Special awards
Miss Friendship: Lok-Sze Miu 繆樂詩 (Manila)
Miss Cool & Charming: Saesim Pornapa Sui 沈玉翎 (Bangkok)

Crossovers
Contestants who previously competed or will be competing at other international beauty pageants:

Miss World
 1993:  Taipei, : Virginia Long (representing )

Miss Universe
 1994: : Hoyan Mok

Miss International
 1992:  Bangkok, : Saesim Pornapa Sui (representing )

External links
 Johnny's Pageant Page - Miss Chinese International Pageant 1994

TVB
Miss Chinese International Pageants
1994 beauty pageants
1994 in Hong Kong
Beauty pageants in Hong Kong